Li Jiayu (April 25, 1892 – May 21, 1944) was a KMT general from Sichuan who was killed during the Second Sino-Japanese War. A veteran of the Xinhai Revolution and the Second Revolution, he served as a regimental officer in the 6th Brigade of the Sichuan clique army, which was part of the Sichuan clique Army 3rd Division commanded by warlord Deng Xihou. He was promoted to commanding officer of the 6th Brigade in 1922 by his superior officer Deng and later promoted to major general and commander of the 1st Division of the Sichuan clique Army in September 1923. In August 1924, he was promoted to Lieutenant General in the Sichuan clique army. On May 21, 1944, he was killed in action in Henan province. On June 22, 1944, he was posthumously promoted to full General.

External links
Li Jiayu on generals.dk

National Revolutionary Army generals from Sichuan
1944 deaths
Politicians from Chengdu
1892 births
Chinese military personnel killed in World War II
Military personnel of the Republic of China killed in the Second Sino-Japanese War
Sichuan clique generals